Asadov is a surname of Azerbaijani origin, slavicised from the Arabic male given name Asad.

Notable people with the surname are:
 Adil Asadov, an Azerbaijani philosopher
 Ali Asadov (* 1956), an Azerbaijani politician 
 Arif Asadov (* 1970), an Azerbaijani professional football coach and a former player 
 Eduard Asadov (1923–2004), Russian poet and writer of Armenian origin 
 Elchin Asadov (* 1987), an Azerbaijani racing cyclist
 Garay Asadov (1923-1944), an Azerbaijani Red Army sergeant
 Mahammad Asadov (1941-1991), an Azerbaijani politician 
 Ogtay Asadov (* 1955), an Azerbaijani politician
 Rafael Asadov (1952-1992), a National Hero of Azerbaijan 
 Vasif Asadov (* 1965), a retired male triple jumper 

Azerbaijani-language surnames
Patronymic surnames
Surnames from given names